Missing women is a shortfall in the number of women relative to the expected number in a region or country.

Missing women can also refer to:

Missing Women Commission of Inquiry, an ongoing criminal investigation into the disappearance of at least 60 women from Vancouver's Downtown Eastside
Missing and murdered Indigenous women, an independent inquiry organized 2015 by the Canadian government
Missing Women (film), a 1951 American crime film

See also
 Missing person
 Missing white woman syndrome